Edge of Hell is an American haunted house attraction located in Kansas City, Missouri. The Edge of Hell was founded in 1975 and is said to be the oldest haunted house in the United States. It is operated by Full Moon Productions, which also operates The Beast and Macabre Cinema.

Reception and awards 
In 2012, HauntWorld listed Edge of Hell together with The Beast (which is also in Kansas City and operated by the same company) as 10th in its list of top 13 best Haunted Houses in America.

The Travel Channel listed the Edge of Hell in its feature on America's Scariest Halloween Attractions.

References 

Haunted attractions (simulated)
Tourist attractions in Kansas City, Missouri
1975 establishments in Missouri